Luis Uruñuela will be a street level stop of line 2 of the Seville Metro. The station will be located in the intersection of Luis Uruñuela avenue and SE-30 ring road. Construction works will begin in late 2011, and the station is expected to be operational during 2017.

Future services

See also
 List of Seville metro stations

References

External links 
  Official site.
  Map of Line 2 project
 History, construction details and maps.

Seville Metro stations
Railway stations in Spain opened in 2017